Pupils of Westminster School and Charterhouse School played a cricket match in London on 5 August 1794 which was recorded in the earliest known scorecard of a schools match.

Description
A notebook compiled by G. B. Buckley held in the library at Lord's Cricket Ground contains the score of a match  sourced from The Star, published on 7 August 1794. The match took place at the Dorset Square ground on Tuesday 5 August 1794 between teams of the City of London and the City of Westminster. A comparison with the Charterhouse and Westminster school registers shows that this was a match between pupils of Charterhouse and Westminster. The match preceded by two years the first fixture between Westminster and Eton on which occasion Dr. George Heath flogged the whole Eton XI on their return. The first recorded Eton-Harrow match did not take place until 1805.

According to H. T. Waghorn the match was played for 500 guineas, although this has been questioned.

Scorecard
  
London

 
 
Westminster  
  

The scorecard does not reflect the Westminster total which actually adds up to 165.

Players

All the Westminsters were still at school, but several of the Carthusians had already left

Charterhouse School (City of London)
 
Ashurst: William Henry Ashurst (1778–1846)
Austin: Either John Austen (1777–1851) or Henry Austen (1779–1850), second cousins of Jane Austen
Blake: Arthur Garland Blake (1779–1812) In service of the East India Company
Kemp: Rev. Edward Kempe (1778–1858)  Curate of Bitton. After his death his executors found nearly a ton of sermons in his house, many of which he never preached.
Lloyd sen. and Lloyd jun: Probably Edward Lloyd (1776–1805) and William Lloyd (1778–1831), sons of the preacher of Charterhouse, but Lloyd jun. might be Charles Lloyd (1779–1809)
Palmer, sen.: Rev. William Jocelyn Palmer (1776–1853) Rector of Mixbury and father of Roundell Palmer, 1st Earl of Selborne
Palmer, jun.: John Horsley Palmer (1779.1858) Governor of the Bank of England
Stone: Either Richard Stone (1775–1849) or Henry Stone (1777–1845)
Stert: Arthur Stert (1776–1849)
Surtes: Aubone Surtees (1777–1859)

Westminster School (City of Westminster)
 
Atterbury: Rev. Charles Lewis Atterbury (1778–1823) Fellow of Christ Church, Oxford - killed in a coach crash
Burrell: Either Percy Burrell (1779–1807) or Walter Burrell (1777–1831).
Coffield: Caulfield, whose name appears in the 1795 School list. He played v Eton 1796.
Cummins: Rev. Henry Comyn (1777–1851) enumerator of the New Forest and vicar of Sancreed and Manaccan
Curtis: Rev. Whitfeld Curteis (1780?-1834).  Played v Eton 1796 Rector of Burwash Sussex and Smarden Kent
French: Savage Towgood French (1777?-1834) Barrister
Graham: Either G. Graham, in School lists 1795 and 1797, or T. Graham, in School list 1797. One of these played v Eton, 1799.
Horsley: Rev. Heneage Horsley (1776–1847) dean of Brechin
Ridley: Either Matthew White Ridley (1778–1836) or Henry Colborne Ridley (1780–1830)
Stevens: Rev. Robert Stevens (1778?-1870) Played v. Eton 1796
Wynn: Charles Wynne Griffith-Wynne (1780–1865)  MP for Caernarvonshire

See also
1794 English cricket season

References

Schools cricket matches
English cricket in the 18th century
1790s in London
1794 in England
1794 in sports